Province of Las Californias was a Spanish Empire province in the northwestern region of New Spain. Its territory consisted of the entire U.S. states of California, Nevada, and Utah, parts of Arizona, Wyoming, and Colorado, and the Mexican states of Baja California and Baja California Sur.

Etymology

There has been understandable confusion about use of the plural Californias by Spanish colonial authorities. California historian Theodore Hittell offered the following explanation:

History

The first attempted Spanish occupation of California was by the Jesuit missionary Eusebio Kino, in 1683. His Misión San Bruno failed, however, and it was not until 1697 that Misión de Nuestra Señora de Loreto Conchó was successfully established by another Jesuit, Juan María de Salvatierra. The mission became the nucleus of Loreto, first permanent settlement and first administrative center of the province. The Jesuits went on to found a total of 18 missions in the lower two-thirds of the Baja California Peninsula.

In 1767, the Jesuits were expelled from the missions, and Franciscans were brought in to take over. Gaspar de Portolá was appointed governor to supervise the transition. At the same time, a new visitador, José de Gálvez, was dispatched from Spain with authority to organize and expand the fledgling province.

The more ambitious province name, Las Californias, was established by a joint dispatch to the King from Viceroy de Croix and visitador José de Gálvez, dated January 28, 1768. Gálvez sought to make a distinction between the Antigua ('old') area of established settlement and the Nueva ('new') unexplored areas to the north.

The single province was divided in 1804, into Alta California province and Baja California province. By the time of the 1804 split, the Alta province had expanded to include coastal areas as far north as what is now the San Francisco Bay Area in the U.S. state of California. Expansion came through exploration and colonization expeditions led by Portolá (1769), his successor Pedro Fages (1770), Juan Bautista de Anza (1774–76), the Franciscan missionaries and others. Independent Mexico retained the division but demoted the former provinces to territories, due to populations too small for statehood.

Geography
The Baja California Peninsula is bordered on three sides by water, the Pacific Ocean (south and west) and Gulf of California (east); while Alta California had the Pacific Ocean on the west and deserts on the east. A northern boundary was established at the 42nd parallel by the Adams–Onís Treaty of 1819. That boundary line remains the northern boundary of the U.S. states of California, Nevada, and the western part of Utah.

Inland regions were mostly unexplored by the Spanish, leaving them generally outside the control of the colonial authorities. Mountain ranges of the Peninsular Ranges, eastern Transverse Ranges, and the Sierra Nevada, along with the arid Colorado Desert, Mojave Desert, and Great Basin Desert in their eastern rain shadows, served as natural barriers to Spanish settlement. The eastern border of upper Las Californias was never officially defined under either Spanish or subsequent Mexican rule. The 1781 Instrucciones and government correspondence described Alta California ("Upper California") as the areas to the west of the Sierra Nevada and the lower part of the Colorado River in the Lower Colorado River Valley (the river forms the present day border between the states of California and Arizona).

See also

 List of governors in the Viceroyalty of New Spain
 Spanish missions in Baja California
 Spanish missions in California
 Indigenous peoples of California
 Population of Native California
 Indigenous peoples of Baja California
 Ranchos of California
 History of California
 History of California through 1899
 Territorial evolution of California
 Spanish colonization of the Americas
The Canadas
The Carolinas
The Dakotas
The Floridas
The Virginias

References

Further reading

External links
 Worldstatesmen.org: Provinces of New Spain

Californias
Californias
Californias
Californias
Californias
Californias
Californias
Californias
Californias
Californias
Provinces of the Spanish Empire
1768 establishments in Alta California
1768 establishments in New Spain
1804 disestablishments in Alta California
1804 disestablishments in New Spain
States and territories established in 1768
States and territories disestablished in 1804
1760s in Alta California
1770s in Alta California
1780s in Alta California
1790s in Alta California
1800s in Alta California
18th century in Mexico
Californias
Californias
Spanish-speaking countries and territories